Rapport is an Afrikaans-language weekly newspaper (released on Sundays) in South Africa and published by Media24. Its head office is in Johannesburg. It is the second largest Sunday newspaper in South Africa after the Sunday Times. Waldimar Pelser has been the editor since 2013.

History
Rapport was established in 1970 (Jordaan 2014). The precursor was Die Beeld, an Afrikaans Sunday newspaper established in the 1960s. Die Beeld later merged with Dagbreek to become Rapport. The Beeld brand was re-established in 1974 with the founding of the daily newspaper, Beeld (Fourie 2007).

Supplements 
Loopbane24 (Sunday)
Sake24 (Sunday)
Sports24 (Sunday)
Weekliks (Sunday)
InRat (once a month)
Rondrits (Sunday)

Distribution areas

Distribution figures

Readership figures

See also
 List of newspapers in South Africa

References

Bibliography

External links
Rapport Website 
SAARF Website

Afrikaner culture in Johannesburg
Weekly newspapers published in South Africa
Mass media in Johannesburg
Companies based in Johannesburg
Afrikaans-language newspapers